Campanula scouleri is a species of bellflower known by the common names pale bellflower and Scouler's harebell. It is native to the mountains of western North America from northern California to Alaska.

Description
It is a rhizomatous perennial herb producing an erect or leaning stem 20 to 30 centimeters long. The leaves are thin to leathery, lance-shaped to round, and generally toothed, measuring 1 to 6 centimeters long and borne on short winged petioles. The pale blue bell-shaped flower has a strongly reflexed corolla with lobes curling back and sometimes almost touching. The style protrudes far from the center of the flower; it is blue in color and up to 1.5 centimeters long.

References

External links

Jepson Manual Treatment
Photo gallery

scouleri